Elizaphan Ntakirutimana (1924, in Kibuye, Rwanda – January 22, 2007 in Arusha, Tanzania) was a pastor of the Seventh-day Adventist Church in Rwanda and was the first clergyman to be convicted for a role in the 1994 Rwandan genocide.

In February 2003, the International Criminal Tribunal for Rwanda found both Ntakirutimana and his son Dr. Gérard, a physician who had completed graduate work in the US prior to returning to Rwanda, guilty of aiding and abetting genocide and crimes against humanity committed in Rwanda in 1994. The Tribunal found it proven beyond reasonable doubt that Ntakirutimana, himself belonging to the Hutu ethnicity, had transported armed attackers to the Mugonero complex, where they killed hundreds of Tutsi refugees. Ntakirutimana was sentenced to 10 years in prison. He was convicted on the basis of eyewitness accounts. A number of the convictions were overturned on appeal but the sentence was unchanged. He was released on December 6, 2006 after serving 10 years under arrest or in prison, and died the following month.

A letter addressed to Ntakirutimana by Tutsi Seventh-day Adventist pastors, which he showed to author Philip Gourevitch, provided the title for Gourevitch's 1998 book We Wish to Inform You That Tomorrow We Will Be Killed With Our Families. The book accuses Ntakirutimana of complicity in the deaths of the refugees.

See also

 Charles A. Adeogun-Phillips
 Wenceslas Munyeshyaka
 Emmanuel Rukundo
 Athanase Seromba

References

External links
 Dennis Hokama, "Former Rwandan Seventh-day Adventist Minister to be Extradited for War Crimes Trial". Adventist Today 8:2 (March–April 2000)

1924 births
2007 deaths
People from Kibuye
Rwandan Seventh-day Adventists
Seventh-day Adventist ministers
Hutu people
People convicted by the International Criminal Tribunal for Rwanda
Protestant religious leaders convicted of crimes
Rwandan people convicted of genocide
Rwandan people convicted of crimes against humanity
Rwandan prisoners and detainees
Rwandan clergy
Rwandan expatriates in Tanzania